So in Love is an album by saxophonist Art Pepper recorded in 1979 and originally released on the Artists House label.

Reception

The AllMusic review by Scott Yanow noted: "Pepper is in excellent form throughout the album, giving these songs heart-wrenching interpretations".

Track listing 
All compositions by Art Pepper except where noted.
 "Straight, No Chaser" (Thelonious Monk) - 6:24
 "Blues for Blanche" - 6:47
 "So in Love" (Cole Porter) - 11:35
 "Diane" - 12:16
 "Stardust" (Hoagy Carmichael, Mitchell Parish) - 10:35  	
Recorded at Sound Ideas Studios, NYC on February 23, 1979 (tracks 1 & 4) and at Kendun Recorders, Burbank, CA on May 26, 1979 (tracks 2, 3 & 5)

Personnel 
Art Pepper - alto saxophone
Hank Jones (tracks 1 & 4), George Cables (tracks 2, 3 & 5) - piano
Ron Carter (tracks 1 & 4), Charlie Haden (tracks 2, 3 & 5) - bass
Al Foster (tracks 1 & 4), Billy Higgins (tracks 2, 3 & 5) - drums

References 

Art Pepper albums
1980 albums
Artists House albums